Sideridis fuscolutea is a species of cutworm or dart moth in the family Noctuidae.

The MONA or Hodges number for Sideridis fuscolutea is 10256.

References

Further reading

 
 
 

Hadenini
Articles created by Qbugbot
Moths described in 1892